is a JR East railway station located in Aoba-ku in Sendai, Miyagi.

There is a direct transfer gate between the platform of this station to the platform of the Sendai Subway Namboku Line in Sendai Station. The Sendai Subway Tōzai Line is connected through the platform of the Namboku Line.  Before the extension of the Senseki Line from Sendai Station, passengers from the subway would have to disembark and walk a good distance to the Senseki Line platform in Sendai Station.

Line
JR East
Senseki Line

Surrounding area
Clis Road Shopping District
Sendai Subway Namboku Line and Sendai Subway Tōzai Line - Sendai Station
Sendai Station

History
March 11, 2000: Station begins operation as the conversion of the Senseki Line in downtown Sendai to underground track completes.

Railway stations in Sendai
Senseki Line
Railway stations in Japan opened in 2000